Davidson Garrett (born September 11, 1952), also known as King Lear of the Taxi, is an American poet and actor living in New York City, New York. He drove a New York City yellow taxi cab from 1978 until 2018 to supplement his acting and writing career. Garrett has authored six books of poetry, and has been published in many literary journals and magazines.

Early life 
Garrett was born September 11, 1952, in Shreveport, Louisiana. Garrett came to New York City in 1972 to pursue an acting career and also because he is gay and was looking for a supportive community.  He studied at the American Academy of Dramatic Arts and with Alice Spivak at the Herbert Berghof Studio in Greenwich Village. Garrett graduated from The City College of New York with a B.A. and M.S.in Education.

Garrett lived at the McBurney YMCA in the Manhattan neighborhood of Chelsea from 1978 until 2000, which was the famous YMCA that the Village People based their pop song anthem on, “Y.M.C.A.”

Poetry 
Poems and other writings have appeared in The New York Times, Xavier Review, The Paddock Review, Sensations Magazine, First Literary Review-East, The Ekphrastic Review, The Stillwater Review, The Episcopal New Yorker, Marco Polo Arts Magazine, Conceit Magazine, Thorny Locust, and Podium, the online literary journal of the 92nd Street Y Unterberg Poetry Center. His poetry has been anthologized in From Somewhere To Nowhere: The End of the “American Dream” (Autonomedia, 2017), Beyond the Rift: Poets of the Palisades (The Poets Press, 2010), and in Pears, Prose and Poetry (Poets Wear Prada / Eggplant Press, 2011).

Garrett has authored six books of poetry, including his most recent title, “Cabaletta: Poems of a New York City Taxi Driver” published in 2022 by Finishing Line Press. ‘’Arias of a Rhapsodic Spirit,” a full-length collection was released in 2020 from Kelsay Books, and  two chapbooks, “What Happened to the Man Who Taught Me Beowulf? and Other Poems”, released in 2017, and “Southern Low Protestant Departure: A Funeral Poem”, released in 2015.  An earlier chapbook “To Tell The Truth I Wanted To Be Kitty Carlisle and Other Poems” was published by Finishing Line Press in 2013.  Garrett's first full-length collection, “King Lear of the Taxi: Musings of a New York City Actor/Taxi Driver,” was published in 2006 by Advent Purple Press. 

In 2013 Garrett was invited to take part in a taxi drivers' writing workshop organized by the poet Mark Nowak and sponsored by the PEN World Voices Festival. He with other members of the workshop read their taxi poems at "Watching the Meter: Poetry from the Taxi Drivers Workshop" at The Public Theater's Joe's Pub in New York City.

In November 2017, Garrett's poem "A Taxi Driver's Die Gotterdammerung” was included in the poetry anthology, "From Somewhere to Nowhere: The End of the American Dream,” which was published by Autonomedia, a nationally known publisher of radical books. This poem documents Garrett's experience when his yellow taxi was parked under the North Tower of the World Trade Center at the moment the first plane hit the North Tower on September 11, 2001.

Spoken word, performance 
Garrett has been performing spoken word plays, poetry and more, primarily in the New York City region.

In 2009, 2010, and 2016, he performed in poet Joel Allegretti's tribute to Leonard Cohen, You Know Who I Am, which was produced by Greenwich Village's Cornelia Street Cafe. Garrett was cast in the play, “Ishtar Redux,” by poet John J. Trause that was staged in 2013 at La MaMa Experimental Theatre Club in an evening of performance works produced by the journal, Nerve Lantern. In August 2015, he was invited to the Boog City Poets’Theatre in the East Village, Manhattan, to perform a new poetic monologue with incidental music titled Nine Meditations on the Nothingness of Now. He collaborated with the musician, Michael Skliar.

Flushing Town Hall, a cultural arts organization in the Borough of Queens, invited Garrett to give an outdoor poetry reading in Diversity Plaza in June 2016, as part of a cultural program celebrating LGBTQ Pride Month in Jackson Heights.

In December 2016, The William Carlos Williams Poetry Cooperative of Southern Bergen County, New Jersey, invited Davidson Garrett to be the featured poet for their monthly poetry series. Garrett performed his entire funeral poem, "Southern Low Protestant Departure" at the William Carlos Williams Center for the Performing Arts in Rutherford, New Jersey.

In January 2017, Garrett was invited to read poems in a series of four shows at Cornelia Street Cafe, titled: "What Were The Sixties Really Like?" which were produced and curated by the poet/playwright Kathyn Adisman.

The Workers Unite Film Festival, an annual event in New York City, invited Garrett to be one of the featured poets in May 2018, in a venue in Brooklyn, New York, as a prelude to the feature film, "The Acting Class," by British filmmakers, Deirdre O'Neill and Mike Wayne. The poetry reading was curated by the poet, Vanessa Jimenez Gabb. Garrett spoke about the taxi industry and also read poems about his long career as a taxi driver. 

In 2017, Garrett’s spoken word play, “Conspiracy Theory: The Mysterious Death of Dorothy Kilgallen,” was performed at the Boog City Poets’Theater Festival, curated by poet, Joel Allegretti. The play was published in Issue 8 of the performance art journal, “Nerve Lantern.” 

 Awards and honors 

In 2000, Garrett’s chapbook, “Taxi Dreams,” was a finalist in the Gival Press National Chapbook Competition.
In 2009, Garrett was featured in Amy Braunschweiger's book Taxi Confidential: Life, Death and 3 a.m. Revelations in New York City Cabs''.

In June 2014, Garrett was awarded first place in the 2nd Annual Juanita Torrence-Thompson International Poetry Competition sponsored by Amulet Poetry Magazine.

Curation 
In August 2016, Garrett was the curator for Poets' Theater at the 9th Annual Boog City Music, Poetry and Theater Festival, presenting eight short plays  in the East Village, Manhattan.

On September 30, 2018, Garrett was invited to be the poetry curator of "An Afternoon of Poetry in Albert's Garden." For this reading, Garrett invited the poets, Jeffrey Cyphers Wright, John J. Trause, Hilary Sideris, Austin Alexis, and Jessica Nooney to be featured with readings from their published works. Garrett served as Emcee for the event held in the Shade Garden, and he ended the reading with his recently published poem, "Texas Wildflowers in Spring: In Memory of Lady Bird Johnson."

Filmography 
In 2019, Garrett was the subject of the short film: “The Taxi Cab Poet: Davidson Garrett,” by filmmaker, Zardon Richardson. The film was screened at the Jerome L. Greene Performance Space at WNYC Radio, as a part of the PEN World Voices Festival.

In September 2008, texts from Garrett's book,  “King Lear of the Taxi” were used for the short film, "Taxi Driver," screened at the Portobello Film Festival in London, U.K. by director Ray Andrew Wilkes, with Garrett recording the voice-over for the film.

Publications

References

External links
 Video: Davidson Garrett Taxi Cab Poet (2019) by Zardon Media on YouTube (screened at the PEN World Voices Festival, May, 2019)
Video: The Nuyorican Poets Cafe 40th Anniversary Celebration: Davidson Garrett (2014) by PEN America on YouTube
Video: Watching the Meter: Poetry from the Taxi Drivers Workshop - Davidson Garrett (2013) by PEN America on YouTube
Video: Interview - Davidson Garrett, King Lear of The Taxi (2010) by Ted Krasdale on YouTube

Living people
21st-century American poets
Poets from New York (state)
Poets from Louisiana
Male actors from New York (state)
1952 births
American male poets
21st-century American male writers
American LGBT poets
Gay poets
People from Shreveport, Louisiana
21st-century LGBT people